William Birrell (13 March 1897 – 29 November 1968) was a Scottish professional footballer who made over 220 appearances as a forward in the Football League for Middlesbrough. He also made over 120 appearances in the Scottish League for Raith Rovers. He began his career in management while a player at Raith Rovers and after his retirement, he managed Football League clubs Bournemouth & Boscombe Athletic, Queens Park Rangers and Chelsea.

Personal life 
Birrell's brother Bob was also a footballer.

Career statistics

Player

Manager

Honours

As a player 
Middlesbrough

 Football League Second Division: 1926–27

As a manager 
Chelsea

Football League South War Cup: 1943–44, 1944–45

References

External links 

 
Billy Birrell at chelseafc.com

Scottish footballers
Scottish football managers
Raith Rovers F.C. players
Middlesbrough F.C. players
Queens Park Rangers F.C. managers
Chelsea F.C. managers
1897 births
1968 deaths
Raith Rovers F.C. managers
Scottish Football League managers
Association football inside forwards
Association football outside forwards
English Football League players
English Football League managers
Inverkeithing United F.C. players
Kirkcaldy United F.C. players